Bishazari Tal, also spelled Beeshazar Tal, is an extensive oxbow lake system in the buffer zone of the Chitwan National Park, a protected area in the Inner Terai of central Nepal. In August 2003, it has been designated as a Ramsar site.

The Nepali words 'bis' बिस् (twenty), 'hajār' हजार् (thousand) and 'tāl' ताल् (lake) mean '20,000 lakes'.

Fauna 

The forested wetland provides habitat as a waterhole and wildlife corridor for several wildlife species that includes mammals, birds and reptiles.
The forested wetland provides habitat to several mammals that includes Bengal tiger (Panthera tigris tigris), Sloth bear, Smooth-coated otter, one-horned rhinoceros (Rhinoceros unicornis), Wild boar (Sus scrofa) and Indian porcupine (Hystrix indicus).
Along with mammals the wetland hosts Indian peafowl (Pavo Cristatus), white-rumped vulture, Pallas's fish-eagle, lesser adjutant, and ferruginous duck.
The reptiles that are found here includes Indian rock python (Python molurus), King cobra (Ophiohagus hannah) and Mugger crocodile (Crocodylus palustris).

See also
List of lakes of Nepal

References

External links 
 The Ramsar Convention on Wetlands: The Annotated Ramsar List of Nepal
 Wikimapia : Bishazari Tal

Lakes of Bagmati Province
Ramsar sites in Nepal
Protected areas established in 2003